The HD Pentax-D FA 645 35mm F3.5 AL [IF] is a medium format wide angle lens for the Pentax 645 system. It was announced by Ricoh on November 11, 2015.

References

035
Products introduced in 2015